Frederick Schauer (born January 15, 1946) is an American legal scholar who serves as David and Mary Harrison Distinguished Professor of Law at the University of Virginia School of Law. He is also the Frank Stanton Professor emeritus of the First Amendment at Harvard University's Kennedy School of Government. He is well known for his work on American constitutional law, especially free speech, and on legal reasoning, especially the nature and value of legal formalism.

In his 1982 book Free Speech: A Philosophical Enquiry, Schauer says that government attempts to restrict freedom of expression have resulted in a disproportionate number of government mistakes. He argued that when governments restrict expression, they are incentivized to censor criticism of themselves, which makes it harder for them to assess the cost and benefits of their subsequent actions.

Education
J.D. Harvard Law School 1972
M.B.A. Tuck School of Business, Dartmouth College 1968
A.B. Dartmouth College 1967

Publications 
Analogy, Expertise, and Experience, 249 U. Chi. L. Rev. 84 (2017).
 The Force of Law (2015).
 The Theory of Rules, by Karl Llewellyn, edited and with an introduction by Schauer (2011).
 Thinking Like a Lawyer: A New Introduction to Legal Reasoning (2009).
 The Supreme Court, 2005 Term — Foreword: The Court’s Agenda – And the Nation’s, 120 Harv. L. Rev. 4 (2006).
 Profiles, Probabilities, and Stereotypes (2003).
 Playing By the Rules: A Philosophical Examination of Rule-Based Decision-Making in Law and in Life (1991).
 The Philosophy of Law: Classic and Contemporary Readings with Commentary (with Walter Sinnott-Armstrong) (1996).
 Supplements to Gunther, Constitutional Law (1983–1996).
 Law and Language (editor) (1992).
 The First Amendment: A Reader (with John H. Garvey) (1992).
 Free Speech: A Philosophical Enquiry (1982).
 The Law of Obscenity (1976).

References

1946 births
Living people
American legal scholars
Harvard University faculty
University of Virginia School of Law faculty
Harvard Law School alumni
Tuck School of Business alumni